The  is the  professional wrestling world heavyweight championship created and promoted by the Japanese promotion CyberFight currently defended in the Pro Wrestling Noah brand division. It is one of CyberFight's two top men's world titles, alongside the KO-D Openweight Championship in DDT Pro-Wrestling. The title was also defended on Impact Wrestling which has a working relationship with Pro Wrestling Noah. It was created on April 15, 2001 when Mitsuharu Misawa defeated Yoshihiro Takayama in a 16-man tournament final. Though its name implies a particular weight class, it has been periodically held by junior heavyweights, including Yoshinari Ogawa, Kenta, Naomichi Marufuji, Katsuhiko Nakajima and Kenoh. There have been a total of 42 reigns shared between 23 different champions. The current champion is Jake Lee, who is in his first reign.

Tournament

Noah held a 16-man tournament to crown the first champion, held over its month-long, 18-event Navigation for the Victory GHC tour. The tour was held from March 18 through April 15, 2001.

† Akiyama and Misawa were originally both counted out, but the match was restarted.

Title history

Combined reigns
 , .

See also
GHC National Championship
GHC Junior Heavyweight Championship
GHC Tag Team Championship
GHC Junior Heavyweight Tag Team Championship
GHC Hardcore Tag Team Championship

References

External links
GHC Heavyweight Championship official title history

Pro Wrestling Noah championships
Heavyweight wrestling championships
World heavyweight wrestling championships